Timmy Mehl (born August 31, 1995) is an American professional soccer player who currently plays as a defender for Forward Madison in the USL League One.

Career

College
Mehl played four years of college soccer at Indiana University between 2015 and 2018, making a total of 72 appearances for the Hoosiers, scoring 6 goals and tallying 4 assists. He was twice selected to the All-Big Ten team.

Professional
On January 23, 2019, Mehl signed with North Carolina FC of the USL Championship. He made his professional debut in a U.S. Open Cup game against the Richmond Kickers on May 15. He made his USL league debut on July 13 in a game against Birmingham Legion FC.

On August 29, 2019, Mehl joined Chattanooga Red Wolves SC of USL League One on short-term loan.

On June 30, 2020, Loudoun United signed Mehl for the remainder of the 2020 season.

Mehl joined the Tampa Bay Rowdies on January 7, 2022. On June 10, 2022, Mehl was loaned to USL League One side Chattanooga Red Wolves for the remainder of the 2022 season. He was released by Tampa following their 2022 season.

On December 7, 2022, Mehl was announced as a new signing for USL League One's Forward Madison for their 2023 season.

Personal life
Mehl attended Loyola High School in Los Angeles. While at Indiana, he majored in exercise science.

References

1995 births
Living people
American soccer players
Association football defenders
Chattanooga Red Wolves SC players
Forward Madison FC players
Indiana Hoosiers men's soccer players
Loudoun United FC players
North Carolina FC players
Tampa Bay Rowdies players
Soccer players from Los Angeles
USL Championship players
USL League One players